The 1999 TIG Classic doubles was the doubles event of the twentieth edition of the second tournament in the US Open Series.

Lindsay Davenport and Natasha Zvereva were the defending champions, but they did not compete  together this year. Zvereva competed with Nathalie Tauziat, and Davenport competed with Corina Morariu; the two teams met in a semifinal match which Davenport and Morariu won. The Americans defeated the Williams sisters in the final to win the tournament. This tournament is notable for being the only doubles final the Williams sisters (as a pair) have lost in their career.

Seeds

Draw

Qualifying

Seeds

Qualifiers
  Janet Lee /  Vanessa Webb

Qualifying draw

External links
 ITF doubles results page

Doubles
TIG Classic - Doubles